Tata CLiQ (stylised as Tata CLiQ) is an Indian e-commerce company based in Mumbai, India. It is owned by Tata Unistore Limited, of Tata Group. Tata CLiQ operates in categories such as Fashion, Footwear and Accessories. Tata Group's E-commerce platform Tata CLiQ also launched a premium and luxury fashion and lifestyle destination, Tata CLiQ Luxury and It have house a wide range of apparel and accessories for men and women by luxury and bridge-to-luxury brands.

History
Tata CLiQ was launched on 27 May 2016. It launched Tata CLiQ Luxury, a luxury fashion and lifestyle venture, in December 2016. In mid-2022, Tata CLiQ exited its consumer electronics business, with the division being integrated with Croma, Tata’s flagship consumer electronics retail chain.

Business Model
TataCLiQ has an omni-channel marketplace model.

Tata CLiQ is the flagship digital commerce initiative of the Tata Group, the India-headquartered global conglomerate with over US$100 billion in annual revenue.

See also
 E-commerce in India
 Online shopping
 Retail
 Omnichannel order fulfillment

References

External links
 Official website

Tata Group
Companies based in Mumbai
Indian brands
Indian companies established in 2016
Retail companies established in 2016
Internet properties established in 2016
Online retailers of India
Privately held companies of India
2016 establishments in Maharashtra
E-commerce in India
Luxury brands